Sandis Prūsis (born 24 October 1965, in Ventspils) is a Latvian bobsleigh coach and former bobsledder. Starting his career in the 1980s, he competed professionally from 1990 to 2003. Competing in three Winter Olympics, he earned his best finish in the two-man event at Nagano in 1998, he got fifth place.
Prūsis's best Bobsleigh World Cup finish was second two times, all in the four-man event (2000-1, 2002-3).

Professional career
Sandis Prūsis started to compete in the 1980s. In his first Winter Olympic Games in 1992 he was a originally a reservist, but took part in the games due to Jānis Ķipurs' injury, delivering a surprise by managing to overtake the team of his compatriot Zintis Ekmanis. In 1998 he was 5th in two-man competition and 6th in four-man competition in the Winter Olympic Games at Nagano. In 1998 he came 3rd in the World Cup in two-man competition and combined competition. In the World Cups of 2000 and in 2003 Sandis Prūsis won the silver medal in four-man competition in general classification. In 2001 he won silver in four-man and bronze in combined competition at the World Cup. He became the four-man European champion in 2000 and 2003 (along with brakemen Mārcis Rullis, Jānis Silarājs, and Jānis Ozols).

Prūsis has been a six-time-winner of the Latvian Bobsleigh Championship (1993, 1995, 1998 to 2001), champion of the Latvian SSR (1990), gold medalist at the 2000 Winter Goodwill Games and carried the flag of Latvia at the 1998 Winter Olympics. Sandis Prūsis finished his career after the 2002/2003 World Cup season in bobsleigh. After ending his bobsleigh career, Prūsis coached the Italian bobsleigh team from 2004 to 2006. Since 2006, he has been the head coach for the Latvian team.

References
1992 bobsleigh two-man results
1998 bobsleigh four-man results
1998 bobsleigh two-man results
2002 bobsleigh two-man results
2002 bobsleigh four-man results
List of combined men's bobsleigh World Cup champions: 1985-2007
List of four-man bobsleigh World Cup champions since 1985
List of two-man bobsleigh World Cup champions since 1985

1965 births
Living people
Bobsledders at the 1992 Winter Olympics
Bobsledders at the 1994 Winter Olympics
Bobsledders at the 1998 Winter Olympics
Bobsledders at the 2002 Winter Olympics
Soviet male bobsledders
Latvian male bobsledders
People from Ventspils
Olympic bobsledders of Latvia
Latvian sportspeople in doping cases